Manuela Soccol (born 16 June 1988) is a Belgian marathon runner. She placed 74th at the  2016 Olympics.

References

External links

 

1988 births
Living people
Belgian female long-distance runners
Belgian female marathon runners
Place of birth missing (living people)
Athletes (track and field) at the 2016 Summer Olympics
Olympic athletes of Belgium
World Athletics Championships athletes for Belgium